Uruguay national field hockey team may refer to:

 Uruguay men's national field hockey team
 Uruguay women's national field hockey team